Phospholipase A-2-activating protein is an enzyme that in humans is encoded by the PLAA gene.

References

Further reading

Armadillo-repeat-containing proteins